Laurent Gagnebin is a philosopher and Protestant theologian born in Lausanne in 1939.

Works 
 1961: André Gide nous interroge (Lausanne).
 1963: Albert Camus dans sa lumière (Cahiers de la Renaissance Vaudoise, Lausanne).
 1968: Simone de Beauvoir ou le refus de l'indifférence (Fischbacher).
 1971: Quel Dieu ? (L'Âge d'homme).
 1972: Connaître Sartre (Editions Resma-Centurion).
 1978: Silence de Dieu-Parole humaine, le problème de la démythologisation (L'Âge d'Homme, Lausanne; collection "Alethina").
 1987: Du Golgotha à Guernica: Foi et création artistique (Paris, les Bergers et les mages).
 1987: Christianisme spirituel et christianisme social, la prédication de Wilfred Monod" (Genève, Labor et Fides).
 1992: Le culte à chœur ouvert (Paris/Genève, Les Bergers et les Mages/Labor et Fides).
 1994: Nicolas Berdiaeff ou de la destination créatrice de l'homme (L'Âge d'Homme, Lausanne).
 1996: Pour un christianisme en fêtes (Paris, Église réformée de la Bastille).
 1997: Le protestantisme (Paris, Flammarion (Dominos 122))
 1999: Albert Schweitzer (Paris, Desclée de Brouwer)
 2005: Le protestantisme, la foi insoumise (en collaboration avec Raphaël Picon) (Paris, Flammarion (champs 591))
 2006: Le protestantisme: ce qu'il est, ce qu'il n'est pas (7e éd.)(Carrières-sous-Poissy, La Cause)
 2006: La bénédiction du mariage (collection Edifier et Former, Edition Olivétan)
 2009: L'athéisme nous interroge (Beauvoir, Camus, Gide, Sartre), éd. Van Dieren, Read online

External links 
 Laurent GAGNEBIN, le choix de l’existentialisme
 Interview de Laurent Gagnebin
 Laurent Gagnebin on Évangile et Liberté
 

Swiss Protestant theologians
Swiss Protestant ministers
Liturgists
Swiss academics
People from Lausanne
1939 births
Living people
Academic staff of the Protestant Faculty of Theology in Paris